In enzymology, a fucokinase is an enzyme that catalyzes the chemical reaction

ATP + L-fucose  ADP + beta-L-fucose 1-phosphate

Thus, the two substrates of this enzyme are ATP and L-fucose, whereas its two products are ADP and beta-L-fucose 1-phosphate.

This enzyme belongs to the family of transferases, specifically those transferring phosphorus-containing groups (phosphotransferases) with an alcohol group as acceptor.  The systematic name of this enzyme class is ATP:beta-L-fucose 1-phosphotransferase. Other names in common use include fucokinase (phosphorylating), fucose kinase, L-fucose kinase, L-fucokinase, ATP:6-deoxy-L-fucose 1-phosphotransferase, and ATP:L-fucose 1-phosphotransferase. Fucokinase is commonly abbreviated as fuc-K.  This enzyme participates in fructose and mannose metabolism. Fucokinase is the only enzyme that is converting L-fucose to fucose-1-phosphate and it can be further used for synthesizing GDP-fucose, which is the donor substrate for all fucosyltransferase. 
 
L-Fucokinase activity can be detected in varied tissues within an animal. For instance, rats and mice contain L-fucokinase widely distributed throughout tissues especially higher in the brain. However, the levels of L-fucokinase in the brain is widely different among species.

References

 
 
 

EC 2.7.1
Enzymes of unknown structure